Bedotia masoala is a species of rainbowfish in the subfamily Bedotiinae. It is endemic to Madagascar.  Its natural habitat is rivers. It is threatened by habitat loss. This species was described in 2001 by John S. Sparks from a type locality of the Ankavanana River on the Masoala Peninsula in Antalaha District.

References

masoala
Freshwater fish of Madagascar
Taxonomy articles created by Polbot
Fish described in 2001